Sekolah Dato' Abdul Razak (abbreviated SDAR) is a premiere, Sekolah Berasrama Penuh for boys in Seremban, Negeri Sembilan, Malaysia. It is one of the most prestigious schools, selecting the best students in the country and is named after Abdul Razak Hussein.

It was known as a Smart School, before becoming a Cluster School in 2008. In 2010, SDAR was selected as one of the 20 Sekolah Berprestasi Tinggi or High Performance schools in Malaysia. The school is known for its rugby and foyer program.

History

Establishment 
SDAR was established in Johor Bahru on 1 May 1956 as Sekolah Menengah Melayu (Malay Secondary School). The establishment of the school was based on the proposal from the 'Penyata Razak' (Razak Report) 1956. Among the main objectives of the formation of the school was to provide opportunities for bright and potential students from the Malay stream primary school to further their education to the secondary level.

When Sekolah Menengah Melayu was first established, there was no dedicated campus for the students. The first batch of students consisted of 80 boys and they were accompanied by three teachers. The group was assigned to a temporary location in Bukit Zaharah, Johor Bahru. In 1957, half of the original first batch students were assigned to enroll in a new location (now known as Sekolah Tuanku Abdul Rahman) in Ipoh.

The remaining students were then relocated to Tanjung Malim, Perak, staying in the campus provided by the Sultan Idris Training College, SITC (currently known as Universiti Pendidikan Sultan Idris). With larger campus, more students were taken in and enrolment increased to 119. SITC Principal, R.A. Goodchild was appointed as the temporary principal of the new school and he was replaced by C.F. Daniels two months later. Within this period, the school teaching faculty increased to 11, including part-time teachers.

On 5 January 1958, the school new campus building, located next to SITC, was opened and En. Ariffin Mohd Nam was appointed as the first school principal.

School Renaming 
On 29 November 1958, the school was given a new name. The then Minister of Education, Mohamed Khir Johari, officially announced the school's new name as Sekolah Dato’ Abdul Razak, in honour of Dato’ Abdul Razak Hussein, who was the brainchild behind the school formation. Dato’ Abdul Razak himself, who was the Deputy Prime Minister at the time, officiated the renaming ceremony. “Berilmu Untuk Berjasa” became the official school motto.

Extracurricular activities 
Rugby is one of the most popular sports at the school and its rugby team is known as the 'SDAR Lions'. A number of players were selected to play in the Malaysia national rugby union team. The school's rugby team won the National Premier Schools Rugby Championship in 1998 and featured in the final of the 1999 and 2001 editions. Before the school moved to its new campus in Seremban, the team won the Perak state title and the MORI Cup in 1971. It also won Negeri Sembilan school rugby championship and became the only school to win the title in two different states. Since 1973, the school competes with King's College Thailand in an annual rugby match.

In 2011, the school band was featured in a flash mob style, reality programme, Refleksi Orkestra in conjunction with Orkestra RTM 50 Golden Jubilee.

Notable alumni

Politicians 
Dato' Seri Ahmad Husni Mohamad Hanadzlah, former Second Minister of Finance
Dato' Sri Ahmad Shabery Cheek, former Minister of Agriculture and Agro-based Industry
Datuk Dr. Haji Abdul Latif Ahmad, former Minister in the Prime Minister's Department
Dato' Wan Hisham Wan Salleh, former member of Terengganu State Executive Council
Saiful Izham Ramli, political activist
Dato' Salamon Salamat, Malaysian politician, former MP of Shah Alam
Dato' Adnan Abu Hassan, Negeri Sembilan State Assembly Representative (ADUN Senaling)
Dr. Haji Haziq "Ag" (Undergraduate at INTEC Education college)

Public Service 
Dato' Syed Jamal Syed Jaafar, former Chairman of Malaysian Highway Authority (Lembaga Lebuhraya Malaysia LLM)
Dato' Zorkarnain Abdul Rahman, former Director of Selangor & Kelantan State Education Department

Academics 
Emeritus Professor Dato' Dr. Mohd Sham Mohd Sani, former Vice Chancellor of Universiti Kebangsaan Malaysia
Professor Tan Sri Datuk Dr. Nik Mustapha Raja Abdullah, former Vice Chancellor of Universiti Putra Malaysia
Professor Dato' Dr. Ghazali Mat Nor, former Dean of Faculty of Dentistry, Universiti Kebangsaan Malaysia
Emeritus Professor Dato’ Dr. Abdul Samad Hadi, former Director of Graduate Centre, Universiti Kebangsaan Malaysia
Datuk Dr. Adi Taha, former Director of National Museum (Muzium Negara)
Professor Dato Dr Fauzi Ramlan, former Vice Chancellor Universiti Pertanian Malaysia

Arts & Literature 
Shamsudin Jaafar, Malaysian writer

Law 
Tan Sri Ramly Ali, former Federal Court judge
Tan Sri Dato' Sri Ahmad Maarop, jurist and lawyer, 10th President of the Court of Appeal of Malaysia

Business 
Dato' Ir. Abdul Halim Sulaiman, Malaysian businessman, HLA Group of Companies Executive Chairman
Khairun Zainal Mokhtar, Malaysian entrepreneur, CEO Tricubes Berhad

References

External links 
 

Boys' schools in Malaysia